"Dell'amore non si sa" is the lead single from Italian pop tenor Andrea Bocelli's 2004 album, Andrea.  The song was written by Mauro Malavasi, Andrea Sandri and Leo Z, and is among Bocelli's most popular and well-known songs.

Bocelli performed the song at the 2004 ceremony of the Nobel Peace Prize.

The song was featured as a duet with Hayley Westenra on her 2005 album, Odyssey. The duet with Westenra also appears as a bonus track for the Japanese version of Bocelli's The Best of Andrea Bocelli: Vivere.

References

External links
 "Dell'amore non si sa", on Ultratop.be.

Andrea Bocelli songs
2004 singles
Songs written by Mauro Malavasi
2004 songs
Decca Records singles